Pogona microlepidota, the Kimberley bearded dragon, is a species of agama found in Australia.

References

Pogona
Agamid lizards of Australia
Taxa named by Ludwig Glauert
Reptiles described in 1952